Kalamalka Secondary is a public high school in Coldstream, British Columbia, Canada, south of Vernon. It is part of School District 22 Vernon.

Symbols

The Lake Monster is the mascot for Kalamalka Secondary School. It resembles an alligator in appearance and is often seen wearing the Lakers' jersey. The 'Lake Monster' is also displayed on the gymnasium walls and floor. These murals were painted in 2004 by a graduated student.

Notable alumni
Andrew Allen, Singer (graduated in 1999)

References

External links
Kalamalka Secondary School

High schools in Vernon, British Columbia
Schools in the Okanagan
Educational institutions in Canada with year of establishment missing